Bukowo may refer to the following places in Poland:
Bukowo, Szczecin
Bukowo, Opole Voivodeship (south-west Poland)
Bukowo, Podlaskie Voivodeship (north-east Poland)
Bukowo, Człuchów County in Pomeranian Voivodeship (north Poland)
Bukowo, Kartuzy County in Pomeranian Voivodeship (north Poland)
Bukowo, Sztum County in Pomeranian Voivodeship (north Poland)
Bukowo, Warmian-Masurian Voivodeship (north Poland)
Bukowo, Białogard County in West Pomeranian Voivodeship (north-west Poland)
Bukowo, Kołobrzeg County in West Pomeranian Voivodeship (north-west Poland)
Bukowo, Koszalin County in West Pomeranian Voivodeship (north-west Poland)
Bukowo, Wałcz County in West Pomeranian Voivodeship (north-west Poland)